Nasturtium africanum, the Moroccan watercress, is an aquatic plant endemic to Morocco. Two subspecies are recognized:

Nasturtium africanum subsp. africanum - northwestern Morocco
Nasturtium africanum subsp. mesatlanticum (Litard. & Maire) Greuter & Burdet (syn = Rorippa africana subsp. mesatlantica Litard. & Maire = Nasturtium mesatlanticum O.E. Schulz) -- Mid-Atlas Mountains of Morocco

Both subspecies are considered endangered.

References

africanum
Freshwater plants
Flora of Morocco
Plants described in 1922